Sala Municipality may refer to:

Sala Municipality, Sweden
Sala Municipality, Latvia

Municipality name disambiguation pages